James Arthur (born 1988) is a British singer and winner of The X Factor in 2012.

James Arthur may also refer to:

 James Arthur (album), the singer's self-titled debut album
 James Arthur (theologian) (died 1670), Irish Dominican friar and theologian
 James Arthur (mathematician) (born 1944), Canadian mathematician
 James Arthur (poet) (born 1974), American-Canadian poet
 James Arthur (educational researcher), editor of British Journal of Educational Studies
 James Arthur, founder of House of Fraser
 James Osborne Arthur (1887–1971), missionary for the Reformed Church of America
 James B. Arthur (1831–1905), figure in the early founding of Fort Collins, Colorado and Northern Colorado

See also
 Jim Arthur (born 1978), American football coach
 Jamie Arthur (born 1979), Welsh boxer
 James Arthurs (1866–1937), Canadian senator
 Arthur James (disambiguation)